Mayi-Kulan is an extinct Mayi language formerly spoken on the Cape York Peninsula of Queensland, Australia.

Mayi-Kulan and its dialects may be dialects of Ngawun/Wunumara.

References 

Mayabic languages
Extinct languages of Queensland